ROM-4 is a four-member J-pop group that consists of Masaki Kaji, Masataka Kubota, Ryo Kimura, and Gouta Watabe.

History
The rap group "ROM-4" was formed for the Japanese television drama, Seishun Energy: Check It Out, Yo! in Tokyo (青春★ENERGY ~ チェケラッチョ!! In Tokyo), that aired on Fuji TV from April 12, 2006 to June 15, 2006.

The show's about 4 third year high school students of present Tokyo that are not motivated, but when they encounter rap, it helps motivate them to take charge of their lives and their dreams. Thus the song "Keep It Goin' On" represents their motivation, spirit and seishun (young) energy.

In the drama, Takumi (played by Masataka Kubota), Satoru (played by Gouta Watabe), Shingo (played by Masaki Kaji) and Sanpei (played by Ryo Kimura) form the group ROM-4.

The name, ROM-4, is an abbreviation for Rapで、俺(O)達、モ(M)テタイ、Yo(4)！」の略, which means "through Rap R, Oretachi ('we') O, Motetai ('want to be hot') M, Yo (from 'yon' which is Japanese for '4') 4. Therefore, a literal translation of ROM-4, would mean "We want to be hot and rap, yo!"

ROM-4 made their CD debut on June 21, 2006, when they released their CD single called "Keep It Goin' ON" for the show. On November 13, 2006, the single sold 465 copies in Japan and its highest ranking on Oricon was 174, appearing on the chart once.

Discography

Singles stats

Single was released for the Seishun Energy: Check It Out, Yo! in Tokyo TV show in Japan (JPN), only.

Track listings

Track Listings for the Keep It Goin' On CD single:
"Keep It Goin' On"
"Keep It Goin' On (SUNSHINE REMIX)"
"Keep It Goin' On ～Instrumental～"

See also
 Masaki Kaji

References

External links
 Sony MEJ's ROM-4 Webpage
 Fuji TV's ROM-4 Webpage

Japanese pop music groups
Vocal quartets